{{Infobox television season
| season_number        = 13
| caption              = 
| bgcolour             = #4B0082
| module1              = 
| network              = MTV Shows Cafe
| first_aired          = 
| last_aired           = 
| episode_list         = 
| prev_series          = Season 12
|next_series           =Season 14
}}
Mtv Shows Cafe Splitsvilla 13 is the thirteenth season of the Indian reality TV series MTV Splitsvilla''. Hosted by Sunny Leone and Rannvijay Singha,  It premiered on 6 March 2021 on MTV India. Initially the season consisted 9 boys and 12 girls who came to play the game of love, 3 contestants along with 3 dumped contestants entered from Wild Villa. Being shot in Kerala, the theme of the season was based on Cupid's Gold and Silver arrow, With a taglines "One for Love, One for Chance" & "Let Cupid work his magic". The Grand Finale of the show premiered on 2 October 2021 and Jay Dudhane & Aditi Rajput emerged as the winner. whereas Shivam Sharma and Pallak Yadav became 1st Runner-Up.
 
Wild Villa is a secret villa in Splitsvilla, which gives a wild card chance to enter in Splitsvilla and it is exclusively introduced for Voot Select with Nikhil Chinapa as a host. There were 6 hot singles, 3 boys and 3 girls compete against each other to get a Wild Ticket to Splitsvilla. After the 1st finale, the dumped contestants from Splitsvilla also entered Wild Villa to get a chance to wild ticket.

Splitsvilla and Wild Villa

 indicates a male contestant
  indicates a female contestant
  indicates the winner's
  indicates the runner-up's
  indicates the contestant have left due to emergency/medical reasons.
  indicates the contestant has been removed from the show.
  indicates the contestant has been eliminated.
  indicates the original splitsvilla contestants. 
  indicates the celebrity contestants.
  Indicates the contestants was a Facebook audition entry.
 indicates the original wild villa contestants.

Episodes

References

External links 

Official website

Indian reality television series
2021 Indian television series debuts
MTV (Indian TV channel) original programming
Hindi-language television shows
Flavor of Love